This is a list of Curaçao national football team games in 2014.

2014 games

References

2014
2014 national football team results
2013–14 in Curaçao football
2014–15 in Curaçao football